You and Me is a modern Peking opera by composer Zhu Shaoyu. Staged by Zhang Yimou, directing his first Peking opera, the show premiered at the National Centre for the Performing Arts, China (NCPA) in 2013. A 2014 performance of the opera was released on DVD by NCPA Classics in China, and Accentus overseas.

Synopsis
Based on an episode from the Zuo zhuan, the play tells the true story of Duke Zhuang of Zheng and his mother Wu Jiang from the Spring and Autumn period.

Cast

References

2013 compositions
Peking operas
Zhou dynasty in fiction
Plays set in the 8th century BC
Henan in fiction